Donald Mackay,  (born 30 October 1936) is a Canadian scientist and engineer specializing in environmental chemistry.

He was a member of the faculty of Chemical Engineering and Applied Chemistry at the University of Toronto and the founding director of the Canadian Environmental Modelling Centre at Trent University. He has developed several multimedia fugacity models. Mackay has stressed that principles of good practice also need to be adopted for chemical assessments, especially in a regulatory context.

In 2004, he was invested as an Officer of the Order of Canada for having "greatly contributed to the quality and our stewardship of the global environment". In 2004, he was also invested into the Order of Ontario for "his outstanding contributions to environmental science".

References 

1936 births
Living people
Canadian chemists
Environmental scientists
Members of the Order of Ontario
Officers of the Order of Canada
Canadian people of Scottish descent
Academic staff of the University of Toronto

Canadian engineers
Environmental engineers